is a railway station in  the town of Tateyama, Nakaniikawa District, Toyama Prefecture, Japan, operated by the Toyama Chihō Railway.

Lines
Terada Station is served by the Toyama Chihō Railway Main Line and also the Toyama Chihō Railway Tateyama Line.

Station layout 
The station has two sets of opposed ground-level side platforms serving four tracks. The platforms are not sequentially numbered. The station is staffed.

Platforms

Adjacent stations

History
The station opened on 15 August 1931.

Passenger statistics
In fiscal 2015, the station was used by 350 passengers daily.

See also
 List of railway stations in Japan

References

External links

  

Railway stations in Toyama Prefecture
Railway stations in Japan opened in 1931
Stations of Toyama Chihō Railway
Tateyama, Toyama